Gabriel Marian Răduță (born 15 September 1967) is a Romanian former footballer who played as a midfielder. After he ended his playing career, he worked for a while as a manager in the Romanian lower leagues. Later he worked at Dinamo București's youth center where he taught and formed generations of players, which include Ionuț Nedelcearu, Dorin Rotariu, Valentin Costache, Denis Ciobotariu, Ion Gheorghe, Mihai Neicuțescu, Robert Moldoveanu, Constantin Dima and Andrei Tîrcoveanu.

International career
Gabriel Răduță played three friendly games at international level for Romania, making his debut when he came as a substitute and replaced Florin Constantinovici in the 59th minute of a 3–1 loss against Egypt.

Notes

Honours
Wuppertal
Oberliga Nordrhein: 1999–2000

References

1967 births
Living people
Romanian footballers
Romania international footballers
Association football forwards
Liga I players
FC Sportul Studențesc București players
FC Dinamo București players
FC Brașov (1936) players
Wuppertaler SV players
Romanian expatriate footballers
Expatriate footballers in Germany
Romanian expatriate sportspeople in Germany
Romanian football managers